Arrangement in Grey and Black No. 1, best known under its colloquial name Whistler's Mother or Portrait of Artist's Mother, is a painting in oils on canvas created by the American-born painter James Abbott McNeill Whistler in 1871. The subject of the painting is Whistler's mother, Anna McNeill Whistler. It is held by the Musée d'Orsay in Paris, having been bought by the French state in 1891. It is one of the most famous works by an American artist outside the United States. It has been variously described as an American icon and a Victorian Mona Lisa.

History

Anna McNeill Whistler posed for the painting while living in London with her son at Cheyne Walk, Chelsea.

Several unverifiable stories relate to the painting of the work; one is that Anna Whistler acted as a replacement for another model who could not make the appointment. Allegedly, Whistler originally envisioned painting the model standing up. However, his mother was too uncomfortable to pose standing for an extended period.

The work was shown at the 104th Exhibition of the Royal Academy of Art in London (1872), after coming within a hair's breadth of rejection by the Academy. This episode worsened the rift between Whistler and the British art world; Arrangement was the last painting he submitted for the Academy's approval (although his etching of Old Putney Bridge was exhibited there in 1879). Vol. VIII of The Royal Academy of Arts: A Complete Dictionary of Contributors and their work from its foundation in 1769 to 1904 (by Algernon Graves, F.S.A., London 1906) lists the 1872 exhibit as no. 941, "Arrangement in Grey and Black: Portrait of the Painter's mother", and gives Whistler's address as The White House, Chelsea Embankment.

The sensibilities of a Victorian era viewing audience would not accept what was a portrait exhibited as an "arrangement", hence the addition of the explanatory title Portrait of the Painter's mother. From this, the work acquired its enduring nickname of simply Whistler's Mother. After Thomas Carlyle viewed the painting, he agreed to sit for a similar composition, this one titled Arrangement in Grey and Black, No. 2. Thus the previous painting became, by default, Arrangement in Grey and Black, No. 1.

Whistler eventually pawned the painting, acquired in 1891 by Paris's Musée du Luxembourg. Whistler's works, including this one, had attracted several imitators. Numerous similarly posed and restricted-colour palette paintings soon appeared, particularly by American expatriate painters. For Whistler, having one of his paintings displayed in a major museum helped attract wealthy patrons. In December 1884, Whistler wrote:

As a proponent of "art for art's sake", Whistler professed to be perplexed and annoyed by the insistence of others upon viewing his work as a "portrait". In his 1890 book The Gentle Art of Making Enemies, he wrote:

Both Whistler's Mother and Thomas Carlyle were engraved by the English engraver Richard Josey. The image has been used since the Victorian era as an icon for motherhood, affection for parents, and "family values" in general, especially in the United States. For example, in 1934, the U.S. Post Office Department issued a stamp engraved with the portrait detail from Whistler's Mother, bearing the slogan "In memory and in honor of the mothers of America." In the Borough of Ashland, Pennsylvania, an eight-foot-high statue based on the painting was erected as a tribute to mothers by the Ashland Boys' Association in 1938, during the Great Depression.

The image has been repeatedly appropriated for commercial advertisements and parodies, such as doctored images of the subject watching television, and sometimes accompanied by captions such as "Whistler's Mother Is Off Her Rocker."

In summing up the painting's influence, art historian Martha Tedeschi has stated:

Exhibitions in America
Whistler's Mother has been exhibited several times in the United States, notably at the Century of Progress world's fair in Chicago in 1933–34. It was shown at the Atlanta Art Association in the fall of 1962, the National Gallery of Art in 1994, and the Detroit Institute of Arts in 2004. It was exhibited at the Boston Museum of Fine Arts in 1983 in an exhibition called: 
A New World: Masterpieces of American Painting 1760- 1910. 

And from June to September 2006. From May 22 to September 6, 2010, it was shown at the M. H. de Young Memorial Museum in San Francisco. The painting was exhibited at the Norton Simon Museum in Pasadena, California, from March 27 to June 22, 2015, and then at the Clark Art Institute in Williamstown, Massachusetts. It was shown at the Art Institute of Chicago from March 4 to May 21, 2017. It had returned to the Musee d'Orsay as of early August 2019.

In popular culture

The painting has been featured or mentioned in numerous works of fiction and within pop culture. These include films such as Sing and Like It (1934), the Donald Duck short Donald's Diary (1954), The Fortune Cookie (1966), The Rocky Horror Picture Show (1975), Babette's Feast (1986), Bean (1997), I Am Legend (2007), and Cloudy with a Chance of Meatballs 2 (2013).

English rock musician John Lennon used a self-portrait modeled after the painting on the cover of his 1975 compilation album Shaved Fish.

It has been mentioned in television episodes of The Simpsons ("Rosebud", "The Trouble with Trillions", and "The Burns and the Bees").

The painting is mentioned in Vladimir Nabokov's novel Lolita.

The painting is mentioned in part six of Don Delillo's novel Underworld.

In a four-part episode of the Underdog cartoon series (Parts 69-72 in the series) entitled "Whistler's Father", Underdog is assigned to stand guard in a museum to prevent the theft of a valuable painting called Whistler's Father.

The film The Naked Gun 2½: The Smell of Fear (1991) features the shape of the painting as a birthmark that is used to identify a character after he is replaced with an "evil double."

The painting is central to the plot of the comedy film Bean (1997), in which Mr. Bean accidentally defaces it during its repatriation to the United States and secretly replaces it with a poster.

The painting was featured in America's Next Top Model, Cycle 5 to inspire the photoshoots for Olay's Quench body lotion, in a modern interpretation of the classical artwork.

Fred Armisen's character Karl Cowperthwaite frequently mentions the painting in season 4 of the TV show Last Man on Earth.

Cole Porter’s Anything Goes lists the painting in the song "You're the Top".

Actor Hurd Hatfield toured internationally several times with the play Son of Whistler's Mother by playwright Maggie Williams.

The movie Sneakers (1992) features two characters code-named Whistler and Mother, played by David Strathairn and Dan Aykroyd, respectively.

Between 1959 and 2021, the Douglas A-26 Invader serial number 41-39401 was either flown or displayed with the name of Whistler's Mother. It featured a reproduction of the painting on the nose.

In music
Whistler, and particularly this painting, had a profound effect on Claude Debussy, a contemporary French composer. In 1894, Debussy wrote to violinist Eugène Ysaÿe describing his Nocturnes as "an experiment in the different combinations that can be obtained from one color – what a study in grey would be in painting." Whether Debussy used the term color to refer to orchestration or harmony, critics have observed "shades" of a particular sound quality in his music.

See also
 Zephaniah Kingsley, uncle

References

Further reading
 Sutherland, Daniel E. and Toutziari, Georgia (2018). Whistler's Mother: Portrait of an Extraordinary Life. Yale University Press. .
 Walden, Sarah (2003). Whistler and His Mother: An Unexpected Relationship: Secrets of an American Masterpiece. London: Gibson Square; Lincoln, Nebraska: University of Nebraska Press. .

External links

 Whistler's Mother at the Musée d'Orsay

1871 paintings
Paintings in the collection of the Musée d'Orsay
Paintings by James Abbott McNeill Whistler
Portraits of women